Tan Dun: Ghost Opera is an album by the Kronos Quartet and Wu Man. The album contains five compositions by Chinese composer Tan Dun  written in 1994 for string quartet and pipa. , the composition was still on the Quartet's program.

Track list

Personnel

Musicians
David Harrington – violin, water bowl, bowed gong, vocals, one-stringed lute, cymbals, stones
John Sherba – violin, paper whistle, vocals, cymbals, stones, one-stringed lute, bowed gong, waterbowl
Hank Dutt – viola, vocals, cymbals, stones, bowed gong, water bowl
Joan Jeanrenaud – cello, vocals, bowed gong, water bowl
Wu Man – pipa, soprano voice, vocals, bowed gong, tam-tam, Tibetan bells, paper

See also
List of 1997 albums

References

External links
Tan Dun: Ghost Opera

1997 albums
Kronos Quartet albums
Nonesuch Records albums